"17 Again" is a song by British pop duo Eurythmics from their eighth studio album, Peace (1999). It was released as the album's second single on 10 January 2000. The lyrics to "17 Again" find the duo reminiscing about their long-standing career in pop music. The closing of "17 Again" contains an interpolation of 1983's "Sweet Dreams (Are Made of This)".

"17 Again" peaked at number 27 on the UK Singles Chart, becoming the duo's 23rd UK Top 40 hit. In the United States, the single was serviced to adult contemporary radio outlets while promotional-only remixes were issued for nightclubs. "17 Again" became the first Eurythmics song to reach number one on the US Billboard Hot Dance Club Play chart.

Charts

Weekly charts

Year-end charts

Release history

See also
 List of number-one dance singles of 1999 (U.S.)
 List of Billboard Hot Dance Music/Club Play number ones of 2000

References

19 Recordings singles
1999 songs
2000 singles
Arista Records singles
Bertelsmann Music Group singles
Eurythmics songs
RCA Records singles
Songs written by Annie Lennox
Songs written by David A. Stewart